Sciomyza is a genus of flies in the family Sciomyzidae, the marsh flies or snail-killing flies.

Species
S. aristalis (Coquillett, 1901)
S. dryomyzina Zetterstedt, 1846
S. pulchra Roller, 1996
S. sebezhica Przhiboro, 2001
S. simplex Fallén, 1820
S. testacea Macquart, 1835
S. varia (Coquillett, 1904)

References

Sciomyzidae
Sciomyzoidea genera
Taxa named by Carl Fredrik Fallén